Harvey Public School District can refer to:
Harvey School District 152 near Chicago
Harvey Public School District 38 or Harvey Public Schools in North Dakota